Fish Heroes is a video game developed by Craneballs Studio. It is an Arcade video game similar to that of Angry Birds.

Plot 

Shark Mafia is capturing and packaging helpless fishes. Group of Fish Heroes set to sail these fishes from being canned.

Gameplay 
Player's task in every level is to kill all shark to reach the goal he uses a slingshot loaded by fishes. Unlike Angry Birds the game has full 3D graphics so player has to rotate the camera to get the best shot on sharks or blocks. The game has over 100 levels spread across four environments.

Reception 
The game was well received by critics upon its release. It currently holds 75% on Metacritic and 78.75% on GameRankings.

The game was praised for its controls, tons of levels and visuals. on the other hand it was criticised for its physics.

References

External links 
Official site

2012 video games
Puzzle video games
Android (operating system) games
IOS games
Video games developed in the Czech Republic
Single-player video games